Vasyl Krainyk (born 7 June 1996) is a Ukrainian Paralympic swimmer. He represented the Ukraine at the 2020 Summer Paralympics.

Career
Krainyk represented Ukraine in the men's 200 metre individual medley SM14 event at the 2020 Summer Paralympics and won a bronze medal.

References

1996 births
Living people
Ukrainian male medley swimmers
Sportspeople from Donetsk
Paralympic swimmers of Ukraine
Medalists at the World Para Swimming European Championships
Medalists at the World Para Swimming Championships
Paralympic medalists in swimming
Paralympic bronze medalists for Ukraine
Swimmers at the 2020 Summer Paralympics
Medalists at the 2020 Summer Paralympics
Ukrainian male backstroke swimmers
Ukrainian male butterfly swimmers
S14-classified Paralympic swimmers
21st-century Ukrainian people